Eric Walsh (born 1972) served as the Canadian Ambassador to the Republic of Korea between February 12, 2015 and September 2018. He was born in London, Ontario and grew up in Toronto.

Offshore Assignments
Walsh has been a diplomat since 1995. Before he was named ambassador to South Korea, he had assignments in Turkey, Romania, and Switzerland as Deputy Permanent Representative to the Conference on Disarmament and Germany as Deputy Head of Mission.

References

1972 births
Living people
Ambassadors of Canada to South Korea
People from London, Ontario